On 9 December 2019, a Chilean Air Force Lockheed C-130 Hercules military transport aircraft crashed in the Drake Passage while en route to Base Presidente Eduardo Frei Montalva, a Chilean military base on King George Island in Antarctica.

The crash site was located on 12 December 2019 after a three-day search, and no survivors were found.

Aircraft
The aircraft was built in 1978 for the United States Air Force with tail number 77-0324 and serial number 382-4776, but was delivered to the United States Marine Corps as a KC-130R tanker for aerial refueling operations and assigned BuNo 160628. It operated in Cherry Point, North Carolina (VMGR-252) and in Iwakuni, Japan (VMGR-152).

The aircraft was placed in storage at AMARG from 2009 until 2014. After being purchased by the Chilean Air Force for US$7 million, it was refurbished at Hill AFB, Utah, to C-130H standards and delivered in 2015 under the new tail number 990.

Accident
The aircraft departed Punta Arenas, Patagonia, Chile, at 19:55 UTC (16:55 local time) bound for King George Island, Antarctica. The flight was intended to provide supplies to a base in Chilean Antarctic Territory and to bring personnel to inspect a floating fuel supply line and other equipment at the base. The Chilean Air Force flies from Punta Arenas to King George Island monthly. Radio contact with the plane was lost at 21:13 UTC.

Search

A search was conducted by aircraft from the Chilean Air Force, Argentina, Brazil, United Kingdom, United States and Uruguay. Also, two Chilean Navy frigates searched the area where the aircraft was last observed by radar. They were aided by a team of satellite imagery analysts from the Israeli Defense Forces' Unit 9900. The search effort was hampered by rough seas and poor visibility.

Crash site

One day into the search, debris from an aircraft was found floating in the sea  from the last known position of the missing aircraft. Debris and personal items were recovered by Brazilian Navy polar research ship Almirante Maximiano. 

The crash site was located off the coast of South America on 12 December,  from the C-130's last known position. The aircraft fuselage and main components were identified along with human remains. Chilean Air Force chief Arturo Merino confirmed that everyone on board was killed.

Passengers and crew 
The aircraft had 38 people on board, 21 passengers and 17 crew. Fifteen passengers were Chilean Air Force servicemen, three were Chilean soldiers, two were civilians employed by the Inproser engineering and construction firm, and one was a student at University of Magallanes. The crew was composed entirely of Chilean air force personnel.

Investigation 
An accident investigation is being conducted by the Chilean Air Force. , the cause of the crash is unknown, due in part to an insufficient quantity of recovered components. The aircraft experienced a complete break-up, either in-flight, or after crashing into the sea.

See also 

 2011 Chilean Air Force C-212 crash

References 

2019 in Chile
2019 disasters in Chile
Accidents and incidents involving the Lockheed C-130 Hercules
Aviation accidents and incidents in 2019
Aviation accidents and incidents in Antarctica
Aviation accidents and incidents in Chile
2019 C-130 crash
December 2019 events in South America
History of Magallanes Region
December 2019 events in Chile